Chincheros Province is the smallest of seven provinces of the Apurímac Region in Peru. The capital of the province is the city of Chincheros.

Boundaries
North: Ayacucho Region
East: Andahuaylas Province
South: Andahuaylas Province
West: Ayacucho Region

Geography 
Other mountains are listed below:

Political division
The province measures  and is divided into eight districts:
 Chincheros
 Anco-Huallo
 Cocharcas
 Huaccana
 Ocobamba
 Ongoy
 Uranmarca
 Ranracancha
 Rocchacc
 El Porvenir
 Los Chankas

Ethnic groups 
The people in the province are mainly indigenous citizens of Quechua descent. Quechua is the language which the majority of the population (80.41%) learnt to speak in childhood, 19.09% of the residents started speaking using the Spanish language and  0.14% using Aymara (2007 Peru Census).

Culture
Chincheros is also the site of la Fiesta de la Virgen del Carmen.  This yearly Fiesta patronal celebrates the Virgin del Carmen from Mount Carmel in Galilee. During the Spanish conquest of Peru, La Virgen del Carmen became venerated among the native population of the south Andes of Peru. Each locality has its own version of exactly how the veneration began, most related to miracles that she performed, convincing the population. 
The Fiesta is based around a mass followed by dancing, performances, food, and drink. The dances and other performances vary based on location, but most include satire and parody of Spanish characters, such as landlords, the nobility, even toreros. The fight between peoples of the Andes and the Amazon is also represented, wherein the Andeans win and devils steal the souls of dead bodies to take to Hell. 
The Fiesta has also been brought to Lima by those former residents of Chincheros who now reside in the country's capitol.

See also 
 Muyu Muyu

References

Provinces of the Apurímac Region